Avenue of the Arts may refer to:

 Avenue of the Arts (Philadelphia), part of Broad Street in Philadelphia, Pennsylvania, U.S.
 Avenue of the Arts (Boston), part of Huntington Avenue in Boston,  Massachusetts, U.S.